Brittany Lynn Raymond (born February 24, 1995) is a Canadian actress and dancer. She is best known for her role as Riley in the Family Channel series The Next Step and Cori Ross in the USA Network series, Dare Me.

Career
From 2013 to 2017, she starred in the Family Channel series The Next Step, portraying the role of Riley. As part of promotion for the series, she has performed in Canada, the United Kingdom, Australia, and New Zealand. From 2015 to 2016, she portrayed Riley in the spinoff series, Lost & Found Music Studios. In 2019, she reprised her role of Riley for The Next Step Christmas Special, airing on CBBC Gem, and began appearing in the USA Network series Dare Me as Cori Ross.

Aside from being a dancer, she also writes often and helped co-write the scripts for two web-series she was in: Australianaire$ and Graped.  She starred in each of these alongside friend and business partner whom she started the production company "Knuckles on Four" with, Brennan Clost.  The two have produced a six-episode mini web-series, Australianaire$ in 2020 as well as a short film, Almost Twenty, in 2021.

In 2016, she started the YouTube channel, "Jo and Britt" with high school friend Joelle Farrow, whom she met in Grade 12 Writer's Craft Class, bonding over Shaquan Lewis.  The two did promotional events and had sponsorships with Google through their Pixel Phone. They also went to the UK for meet and greets to interact more with fans.  In the time that Jo and Britt was running, they created merch, (clothing, notebooks, and phone cases) on their Threadless website.

Personal life 
Raymond was born on February 24, 1995, in Brampton, Ontario, to parents, Paula and John Raymond, alongside older sister Samantha. Her mother is of Portuguese descent. She danced at Joanne Chapman School of Dance, where she mastered her art. She moved to Georgetown, Ontario, when she booked The Next Step at age 17 after dancing competitively since the age of six.

At the end of 2016, she was diagnosed with Crohn's disease, where she had to have a surgery to remove part of her intestine.  Currently, she is in remission. During that time, she took up knitting and writing more.  She has been dating Benjamin Dunlop, a photographer from Brisbane, Australia since they met at the 5th Canadian Screen Awards in 2017, when she won the Best Performance in a Children's or Youth Program or Series award for her role as Riley in The Next Step.  The two live in an apartment overlooking Downtown Toronto with their cat Sauble.

Filmography

Awards and nominations 
She is a two-time Canadian Screen Award nominee for Best Performance in a Children's or Youth Program or Series, receiving nominations at the 3rd Canadian Screen Awards in 2015 and at the 5th Canadian Screen Awards in 2017 for The Next Step. She won the award in 2017.

References

External links
 

Canadian television actresses
1995 births
Actresses from Ontario
Canadian female dancers
Canadian people of Portuguese descent
People from Brampton
Living people
Canadian Screen Award winners
People with Crohn's disease